Trekanten is a locality situated in Kalmar Municipality, Kalmar County, Sweden with 1,422 inhabitants in 2010.

References

External links 

Populated places in Kalmar County
Populated places in Kalmar Municipality